Emilie Timm (1821-1877) was a Baltic German pianist.

Timm was the daughter of the painter Karl von Brüllow. She married the journalist Alexius von Gretsch in 1844. She was educated in Riga, and was a student of Frederic Chopin in Paris from 1842 through 1844. From 1871, she had her own students in Saint Petersburg, Russia.

References
 BBLD - Baltisches biografisches Lexikon digital

1821 births
1877 deaths
19th-century Latvian people
Baltic-German people
Latvian pianists
19th-century pianists